Susquehanna Polling & Research is an American public opinion polling company, based in Harrisburg, Pennsylvania.

Susquehanna Polling & Research was founded by James Lee in 2000. The firm is the official polling company for ABC 27 television station in Harrisburg. The firm specializes in polling services for Republican candidates, trade groups, businesses, and lobbying firms in Pennsylvania, New Jersey, Delaware, and Maryland.

References

Companies based in Harrisburg, Pennsylvania
Public opinion research companies in the United States
Politics of Pennsylvania